John McIntosh (18 May 1909 – 14 April 1988) was a Progressive Conservative party member of the House of Commons of Canada. He was born in Wick, Caithness, Scotland and became a merchant by career.

The son of John McIntosh and Jessie Swanson, both natives of Scotland, McIntosh was educated in Swift Current, Saskatchewan. In 1935, he married Helen Mary Burroughs. He was a director of the Swift Current Mutual Insurance Company. McIntosh served as a member of the town council for Swift Current from 1948 to 1950 and was mayor from 1955 to 1956.

He was first elected at the Swift Current—Maple Creek riding in the 1958 general election and was re-elected there in 1962, 1963, 1965 and 1968. In 1972, after completing his term in the 28th Canadian Parliament, McIntosh left the House of Commons and did not seek re-election.

Federal electoral history

References

1909 births
1988 deaths
Scottish expatriates in Canada
Members of the House of Commons of Canada from Saskatchewan
People from Wick, Caithness
Progressive Conservative Party of Canada MPs
Mayors of places in Saskatchewan
People from Swift Current